Frank Meissner (July 19, 1894 – May 14, 1966) was an American cyclist. He competed in two events at the 1912 Summer Olympics.

References

External links
 

1894 births
1966 deaths
American male cyclists
Olympic cyclists of the United States
Cyclists at the 1912 Summer Olympics
Sportspeople from Grand Rapids, Michigan